Eagle Ridge Hospital (ERH) is a small general hospital located in Port Moody, British Columbia, on the Port Moody/Coquitlam border. ERH is one of 12 hospitals under the jurisdiction of Fraser Health, which services more than 1.3 million people.

Eagle Ridge Hospital officially opened its doors on 7 April 1984 and operates a 24-hour emergency department, ambulatory, long-term care and acute care programs. It is a Centre of Excellence for elective surgery for urology, obstetrics and gynaecology, plastics and orthopedics. The hospital also offers public education clinics for asthma, diabetes, rehabilitation services and programs for cardiology, children's grief recovery, youth crisis response and early psychosis prevention.

Nearby Eagle Ridge Manor provides 24-hour care in a home-like environment for an additional 75 residents in private and semi-private rooms.

Amenities
24-Hour Emergency
Crossroads Inlet Centre Hospice
Elective inpatient and day surgery
Endoscopy
Early psychosis management and youth crisis response
Children's grief recovery
Outpatient clinics for asthma and diabetes
Laboratory services
Surgical daycare
Minor surgical and medical procedures
Pre-admission clinic
Post-anesthesia recovery room
Regional referral centre for rehabilitation for people recovering from stroke, brain injuries, heart attacks, and amputations
Diagnostic services - general radiography, fluoroscopy, ultrasound, Doppler echocardiography, and CT scanning

Eagle Ridge Hospital Foundation
The Eagle Ridge Hospital Foundation was created in 1982 to raise funds for the equipment the hospital needs to stay abreast of technological change, and to replace worn and outdated items. More than 60% of all new hospital equipment is bought with money raised by the Foundation, which sponsors special events including dinners, auctions, and a charity golf tournament.

References

External links
Eagle Ridge Hospital Foundation

Hospital buildings completed in 1984
Hospitals established in 1984
Hospitals in British Columbia
Buildings and structures in Port Moody